.et is the country code top-level domain (ccTLD) for Ethiopia. Registrars offer second- and third-level domains.

Ethio Telecom, the state-owned telecommunication services provider of Ethiopia, is the registry operator of the domain, and is supported by the registry system developed by ZDNS, an internet infrastructure service provider from China.

Second-level domains 
A number of second-level domains for Ethiopia exist:

 .com.et, for commercial companies.
 .gov.et, reserved for governmental organizations.
 .org.et, for non-profit organizations and non-governmental organizations.
 .edu.et, reserved for educational institutions.
 .net.et, for network-related companies.
 .name.et, for individuals.
 .mil.et, for the Ethiopian National Defense Force

References

External links 
IANA .et whois information

Country code top-level domains
Communications in Ethiopia
Internet in Ethiopia

sv:Toppdomän#E